Jerzy Pichelski (27 November 1903, Saratov – 5 September 1963, Warsaw) was a Polish film and theatre actor.

Selected filmography
 Ostatnia brygada (1938)
 Florian (1938)
 The Three Hearts (1939)
 Border Street (1948)
 Lotna (1959)
 Knights of the Teutonic Order (1960)
 Zamach (1960)
 Bad Luck (1960)

Bibliography
 Skaff, Sheila. The Law of the Looking Glass: Cinema in Poland, 1896-1939. Ohio University Press, 2008.

References

External links

1903 births
1963 deaths
Actors from Saratov
People from Saratovsky Uyezd
People from the Russian Empire of Polish descent
Polish male film actors
20th-century Polish male actors